Alarcão is a Portuguese surname. Notable people with the surname include:

Filipe Alarcão (born 1963), Portuguese product designer
Jorge de Alarcão (born 1934), Portuguese archaeologist

Portuguese-language surnames